Sidney Scholfield Campbell  (born 1909 in London and died on 4 June 1974 in Windsor) was an English organist.

Education

He studied organ under Ernest Bullock and Harold Darke. In 1931 he was awarded the FRCO.

Career
He was
organist of St. Margaret's Church, Leytonstone 1927 to 1929
organist of Chigwell Parish Church 1929 to 1931
organist of West Ham Parish Church 1931 to 1937
organist of St. Matthew's, West Ham 1931 to 1936
organist of St. Peter's Church, Croydon 1937 - 1943
organist of St. Peter's Church, Wolverhampton 1943 to 1947
organist of Ely Cathedral 1949 to 1953
organist of Southwark Cathedral 1953 to 1956 
organist of Canterbury Cathedral 1956 to 1961 
organist of St George's Chapel at Windsor Castle 1961 - 1974.
Sidney Campbell was also organist of St Clements Church in Sandwich, Kent.

References

Cathedral organists
1909 births
1974 deaths
Fellows of the Royal College of Organists
20th-century classical musicians
Organists of Ely Cathedral
20th-century organists